Yu-Pen Su is a Taiwanese aerospace and mechanical engineer.

Career 
Su earned bachelor's and master's degrees in mechanical engineering from National Cheng Kung University in 1970 and National Taiwan University in 1974, respectively. He then earned a doctorate in mechanical and aeronautical engineering at Princeton University.

He is a consultant for the National Chung-Shan Institute of Science and Technology.

In 2022, Su was elected to the Academia Sinica.

References

Year of birth missing (living people)
Aeronautical engineers
Living people
National Chung-Shan Institute of Science and Technology people
Members of Academia Sinica
National Cheng Kung University alumni
National Taiwan University alumni
Taiwanese mechanical engineers
20th-century Taiwanese engineers
21st-century Taiwanese engineers